Odan is a rural locality (a settlement) in Svetlichanskoye Rural Settlement, Kosinsky District, Perm Krai, Russia. The population was 2 as of 2010. There is 1 street.

Geography 
Odan is located 25 km northeast of Kosa (the district's administrative centre) by road. Solym is the nearest rural locality.

References 

Rural localities in Kosinsky District